Dondo is a town, with a population of 64,643 (2014), and a commune in the municipality of Cambambe, province of Cuanza Norte, Angola.

Namesakes 
There are several towns with this name.  This is the one which is a branch terminus on the northern Luanda Railways. The namesakes are in Huila Province, Uíge Province and Huambo Province.

Map 
 Travelingluck.com Map

See also 
 Railway stations in Angola

References 

Populated places in Cuanza Norte Province
Communes in Cuanza Norte Province